George Morris Baker, MBE (1 April 19317 October 2011) was an English actor and writer. He was best known for portraying Tiberius in I, Claudius, and Inspector Wexford in The Ruth Rendell Mysteries.

Early life
Baker was born in Varna, Bulgaria. His father was an English businessman and honorary vice consul and his mother an Irish Red Cross nurse who moved to Bulgaria to help fight cholera.

He attended Lancing College, Sussex; he then appeared as an actor in repertory theatre and at the Old Vic.

Career

Early film stardom
Baker's first film was The Intruder (1953). He made his name in The Dam Busters (1955), and his first starring role was in The Ship That Died of Shame (1955) with Richard Attenborough.

Baker also starred as a leading man in The Woman for Joe (1955) opposite Diane Cilento; The Feminine Touch (1956), playing a handsome doctor in a nurse film; A Hill in Korea (1956), playing a heroic soldier, with Robert Shaw and Stanley Baker in support; and The Extra Day (1956), a comedy.

Baker was also the lead in These Dangerous Years (1957), an attempt to make a film star of Frankie Vaughan. He was a doctor again in No Time for Tears (1957) and played a royalist swashbuckling hero of the English Civil War in The Moonraker (1958). He supported Diana Dors in Tread Softly Stranger (1958).

Baker's later films included Lancelot and Guinevere (1963) and Curse of the Fly (1965).

Television work
Over time, Baker became better known as a television actor. He had the heroic lead in Rupert of Hentzau (1964), played security chief Thallon in Undermind (1965), and was the second (to Guy Doleman) of many actors to portray the role of "Number Two" in the series The Prisoner, appearing in the series' first episode. He portrayed the character of George King in Dennis Potter's The Bone Grinder (1968), a metaphor for the decline of the British Empire and the rise of American power in the post-war world.

He appeared in his own TV comedy series Bowler. He was also in the first episode of Some Mothers Do 'Ave 'Em, playing a company boss interviewing the show's hapless main character.

In the acclaimed 1976 drama serial, I, Claudius, Baker played the emperor Tiberius Caesar. George R.R. Martin, author of the book series A Song of Ice and Fire, which was later adapted into TV's Game of Thrones, has stated that the historical Tiberius and Baker's performance in particular were part of the inspiration for his character Stannis Baratheon. He also appeared in an episode of Get Some In!.

In 1977, he starred as Inspector Roderick Alleyn in the Ngaio Marsh Theatre; four adaptations of the crime and mystery novels of Ngaio Marsh with New Zealand settings, in a production for New Zealand television. From 1987 to 2000, he played Inspector Reg Wexford in numerous television adaptations of mysteries by Ruth Rendell and this is probably the role for which he became best known. In 1993, following the death of his second wife, he married the actress Louie Ramsay, who played Mrs Wexford in the same television series.

He also appeared in The Baron, Survivors, Minder in Series 1's You Gotta Have Friends, Coronation Street (as brewery owner Cecil Newton), in the Doctor Who story Full Circle and as twin brothers in a 2005 episode of Midsomer Murders titled "The House in the Woods".

Baker also appeared in the British comedy television series The Goodies' episode "Tower of London" as the "Chief Beefeater", as well as in the sitcom No Job for a Lady, and he is popularly known for playing Captain Benson, the James Bond ally in the film The Spy Who Loved Me, and for playing Sir Hilary Bray, a heraldry expert, in On Her Majesty's Secret Service. Later, when Bond, played by George Lazenby, impersonates Bray to gain access to Blofeld, Baker's voice was dubbed in place of Lazenby's to provide the accent. Baker also played an (uncredited) NASA engineer in You Only Live Twice.

Ian Fleming considered Baker to be the ideal candidate to play James Bond in the films but the role went to Sean Connery because Baker had prior commitments.

He played a character called "Jamus Bondus" in an episode of 1970's farcical sitcom Up Pompeii!.

Baker's first theatre work was in repertory at Deal, Kent. His major stage credits include a season with the Old Vic company (1959–61), where he played Bolingbroke in Richard II, Jack in The Importance of being Earnest and Warwick in Saint Joan. In 1965 he started his own touring company, Candida Plays, based at the Theatre Royal, Bury St Edmunds, Suffolk. He was Claudius in Buzz Goodbody's celebrated, modern-dress Hamlet for the Royal Shakespeare Company in 1975.

In 1980 Baker wrote Fatal Spring, a play for television dealing with lives of poets Wilfred Owen, Siegfried Sassoon and Robert Graves; this appeared on BBC 2 on 7 November 1980. It won him a United Nations peace award. His other writing credits included four of the Wexford screenplays.

Baker was the subject of This Is Your Life in 1995 when he was surprised by Michael Aspel during a photo shoot on board a boat at Port Solent on the Hampshire coast. He has also appeared on Lily Savage's Blankety Blank.

MBE
In 2007, Baker was made a Member of the Order of the British Empire (MBE) for his charitable work helping establish a youth club in his home village.

Personal life
Baker's third wife, Louie Ramsay, who died earlier in 2011, played his onscreen wife Dora in The Ruth Rendell Mysteries. Baker was survived by five daughters (four from his first marriage, one from his second to Sally Home).

His granddaughter Kim Sherwood is a writer; her debut novel, Testament, was inspired by her paternal grandmother's experience of the Holocaust as well as her grief over Baker's death. Sherwood was selected in 2021 to write a trilogy of James Bond books, the franchise of which Baker participated in several of its film adaptations, becoming the first female to do so.

Death
Baker died on 7 October 2011 at the age of 80. He died of pneumonia, after a stroke.

Filmography

 The Intruder (1953) as Adjutant
 The Ship That Died of Shame (1955) as Bill
 The Dam Busters (1955) as Flight Lieutenant D.J.H. David Maltby, D.S.O., D.F.C
 The Woman for Joe (1955) as Joe Harrop
 The Feminine Touch (1956) as Jim
 A Hill in Korea (1956) as Lt. Butler
 The Extra Day (1956) as Steven Marlow
 These Dangerous Years (1957) as Padre
 No Time for Tears (1957) as Dr. Nigel Barnes
 The Moonraker (1958) as The Moonraker
 Tread Softly Stranger (1958) as Johnny Mansell
 Lancelot and Guinevere (1964) as Sir Gawaine
 The Finest Hours (1964) as Lord Randolph (voice)
 Curse of the Fly (1965) as Martin Delambre
 Mister Ten Per Cent (1967) as Lord Edward 
 You Only Live Twice (1967) as NASA Engineer (uncredited)
 Justine (1969) as British Ambassador David Mountolive
 Goodbye, Mr. Chips (1969) as Lord Sutterwick
 On Her Majesty's Secret Service (1969) as Sir Hilary Bray
 The Executioner (1970) as Philip Crawford
 A Warm December (1973) as Dr. Henry Barlow
 Three for All (1975) as Eddie Boyes
 Intimate Games (1976) as Professor Gottlieb
 The Twelve Tasks of Asterix (1976) as Various (English version, voice)
 The Spy Who Loved Me (1977) as Captain Benson
 The Thirty Nine Steps (1978) as Sir Walter Bullivant
 North Sea Hijack (1980) as Fletcher
 Hopscotch (1980) as Westlake 
 Time After Time (1986) as Valentine Swift
 Out of Order (1987) as Chief Inspector
 For Queen & Country (1988) as Kilcoyne
 Back to the Secret Garden (2001) as Will Weatherstaff

Television

 Nick of the River (1959). Detective Inspector D.H.C. 'Nick' Nixon.
 Maigret (1961) as Dominic Pere in The Simple Case.
 Rupert of Hentzau (1964) as Rudolf Rassendyll / King Rudolf V
 The Sullavan Brothers (1965) as Edward Drayton
 The Wednesday Play - Alice (1965) as Rev Charles Lutwidge Dodgson
 The Prisoner: "Arrival" (1967) as The New Number Two
 The Bone Grinder (1968) as George King
 Some Mothers Do 'Ave 'Em (1973) as Mr. Lewis
 The Protectors (1973) as George Dixon
 Bowler (1973) as Stanley Bowler
 Survivors (1975) as Arthur Wormley
 I, Claudius (1976) as Tiberius 
 Ngaio Marsh Theatre (1977) as Chief Inspector Roderick Alleyn
 Doctor Who: Full Circle (1980) as Login
 The Gentle Touch (TV series 1981) as Gerald Harvey
 Triangle (1982–1983) as David West
 Robin of Sherwood (1984–1986) as Sir Richard of Leaford
 Miss Marple (1987) as Inspector Fred Davy
 The Ruth Rendell Mysteries (1987–2000) as Inspector Reg Wexford 
 Bergerac (1988) 
 Journey's End (1988) as Colonel
 No Job for a Lady (1990) as Godfrey Eagan
 Little Lord Fauntleroy (1995) as Lord Dorincourt
 Randall & Hopkirk (Deceased) (2001) 'O Happy Isle' as Berry Pomeroy
 Midsomer Murders (2005) 'The House in the Woods' as Twins Charlie / Jack Magwood
 Spooks (2005) as Hugo Ross
 Heartbeat (2007) as Maurice Dodson
 New Tricks (2007) as Steve Palmer (final appearance)

Publications

References

External links 
 

1931 births
2011 deaths
English male film actors
English male television actors
People educated at Lancing College
Members of the Order of the British Empire
Place of death missing
20th-century English male actors
21st-century English male actors
Deaths from pneumonia in England